Anders Stilloff (1866–1941) was a Norwegian journalist, playwright, newspaper editor and theatre critic. His theatre debut was the play Sagfører Hellmanns from 1902. He was the first editor of the Bergen newspaper Morgenavisen, which he edited from 1902 to 1915.

References

1866 births
1941 deaths
Norwegian dramatists and playwrights
Norwegian newspaper editors
Norwegian theatre critics